L. Mark Purtell (July 23, 1889 – 1970) was a long-time minor league baseball player and manager. He also scouted for the New York Giants, Boston Braves, and Pittsburgh Pirates.

He is the brother of Billy Purtell.

A shortstop and third baseman, Purtell played from 1908 to 1939, with occasional interruptions in-between. For example, he did not play in 1914, 1918, 1919, 1925, 1927, 1932, 1935 or 1937. He was never a strong hitter, hitting near the Mendoza Line multiple times and never hitting more than six home runs in a season. His statistical record is incomplete, however it is known that he had at least 1,541 hits, of which at least 190 were doubles, 40 were triples and 12 were home runs.

Managerial career
Purtell managed for 18 seasons. He skippered the Hutchinson Wheat Shockers (1923–1924, 1933), Springfield Midgets (1925–1926), St. Joseph Saints (1927), Joplin Miners (1927–1928, 1932), Independence Producers (1929–1932), Hutchinson Miners (1932), Bartlesville Bronchos (1933), Bartlesville Reds (1934–1935), Fremont Reds (1936), Mobile Shippers (1937–1939) and Paris Lakers (1956).

League championships
Purtell led six teams to league championship victories, averaging one every three years:

Team, Year

Springfield Midgets, 1926
Joplin Miners, 1928
Independence Producers, 1930
Mobile Shippers, 1937
Mobile Shippers, 1938
Paris Lakers, 1956

References

1889 births
1970 deaths
Minor league baseball players
Minor league baseball managers
Bartlesville Reds players
Boston Braves scouts
New York Giants (NL) scouts
Pittsburgh Pirates scouts
Paris Lakers players